Raul Maia Cabral (born 6 October 1981) is a Brazilian football coach, currently the head coach of Hercílio Luz.

Career
Born in Tubarão, Santa Catarina, Cabral started his career at Figueirense, being a manager of the club's youth sides. In July 2013 he moved to fierce rival Avaí, again assigned to the youth setup.

In 2014, Cabral was appointed assistant manager of the main squad. He was also named interim in two occasions: the first, as a replacement to Emerson Nunes in a 2–1 win against Figueirense, and the second in four matches after the dismissal of Pingo.

On 19 August 2014 Cabral was appointed at the helm of Grêmio's under-20 side. On 16 December, however, he returned to his previous club Avaí, again as an assistant.

Cabral was also an interim in 2015, but after a 1–2 loss against Marcílio Dias, he was replaced by Gilson Kleina. The latter was sacked on 10 November of that year, and Cabral was again named interim until the end of the year. He remained in charge until March 2016, being replaced by Silas.

On 15 June 2016, Cabral was named Mirassol manager. On 27 October, his departure to Tombense was confirmed, and he spent the 2017 campaign in charge of the club.

On 19 March 2018, Cabral was confirmed as head coach of Concórdia, and finished the season at Jataiense. He then returned to Mirassol in 2019, now in charge of the under-20 team, before being named coordinator of Figueirense's youth categories on 15 November of that year.

On 22 October 2020, after working as an assistant at Figueira, Cabral was appointed Primavera head coach. He was named in charge of Juventus de Jaraguá on 4 December, but was dismissed the following 5 March, after just three matches into the new season.

On 20 March 2021, Cabral was announced at Luverdense. Sacked on 5 May, he took over Hercílio Luz on 30 July.

References

External links
Memória Avaiana profile 

1981 births
Living people
Sportspeople from Santa Catarina (state)
Brazilian football managers
Campeonato Brasileiro Série A managers
Campeonato Brasileiro Série B managers
Campeonato Brasileiro Série C managers
Avaí FC managers
Mirassol Futebol Clube managers
Tombense Futebol Clube managers
Esporte Clube Primavera managers
Grêmio Esportivo Juventus managers
Luverdense Esporte Clube managers